Mogonono is a village in Kweneng District of Botswana. The village is located 10 km from the center of Molepolole, along the Molepolole–Lephepe road, and has a primary school. The population of Mogonono was 201 in 2001 census.

References

Kweneng District
Villages in Botswana